The Kandera is a Hindu community found in the state of Rajasthan in India. They belong to kshatriyavarna.

History and origin
The community is historically associated with the occupation of cotton ginning. In the local language, Rajasthani, the word kani means cotton, and kandera means someone who works with cotton. Like many groups in Rajasthan, they are kshatriya, they claim Rajput descent and trace their lineage to the Suryavanshi Rajputs  to prove their claim they obtained the pramanptra(certificate of proof ) given by the group brahmans. their ancestor, a KanakpalSingh had fallout with Alauddin Khalji, the Muslim ruler of North India. He was defeated by the Sultan, and many members of his clan accepted Islam and some are who succeeded to leave this place that is known as kandera or kadera.

Present circumstances
The Kandera are found mainly in Jaipur, Alwar, Bharatpur and Sawai Madhopur districts. Their native dialect is Braj Bhasa. The community are divided into thirty six clans, and they practice clan exogamy.

References

Muslim communities of Rajasthan